Dauling Dragon (Chinese: 木翼双龙) is a wooden roller coaster located at Happy Valley in Wuhan, Hubei, China. It is China's third wooden roller coaster and its first racing roller coaster. Although billed as a racing coaster, it contains elements that make it similar to dueling coasters, such as racing portions, head-on collision turn-arounds, and sections where the tracks weave around each other. This is much like Lightning Racer at Hersheypark (however, Lightning Racer was manufactured by Great Coasters International).

Dauling Dragon is famous for its iconic "high five" section, in which at the top of a hill each track banks to 90 degrees towards the other track in such a fashion that riders could appear to reach up and high five riders in the other train, although the trains are too far away for actual contact to be made. This has earned Dauling Dragon the nickname "High Five Coaster".

Awards

References